Sahand-e Olya (also Romanized as Sahand-e ‘Olyā and Sahand Olya) is a village in Mah Neshan Rural District, in the Central District of Mahneshan County, Zanjan Province, Iran. At the 2006 census, its population was 974, in 231 families.

References 

Populated places in Mahneshan County